Finder's Fee is a 2001 American film directed by Jeff Probst from his original screenplay.

Plot
The film takes place over the course of a single evening. Tepper, played by Erik Palladino, finds a wallet on his way home from work. He contacts the owner of the wallet by telephone, and then later discovers that the wallet contains the winning ticket in a $6 million lottery.

Complications arise when Tepper's friends come over for their regular poker night. One of the conditions of the game is that everyone purchase a ticket for the lottery, to be thrown into the pot. The game is played as a freezeout, with the winner collecting all the tickets and any prizes they may be worth. When the owner of the wallet, played by James Earl Jones, arrives, he realizes that the winning ticket is in the pot, and stays to play in the game.

Cast

Reception
The film received generally positive reviews from critics. The film holds a 60% fresh rating on Rotten Tomatoes with a score of 60% based on reviews from 5 critics.

Awards
Finder's Fee won the Golden Space Needle Award, given to the audience's choice for Best Picture at the 2001 Seattle International Film Festival.

Jeff Probst won the Best Screenplay (Feature Film) at the 2001 Method Fest Independent Film Festival.

James Earl Jones won Best Actor in a DVD Premiere Movie at the 2003 DVDX Awards.

References

External links
 
 

2001 films
2000s buddy films
American buddy drama films
American independent films
Films about gambling
2001 drama films
2001 directorial debut films
2003 drama films
2003 films
2000s English-language films
2000s American films